Portimão is a Portuguese wine region centered on the Portimão municipality in the Algarve region. The region has Portugal's highest wine classification as a Denominação de Origem Controlada (DOC). The region is bordered by the Lagoa DOC to the east and the Lagos DOC to the west.

Grapes
The principal grapes of the Portimão region include Crato Branco, Negra Mole and Periquita.

See also
List of Portuguese wine regions

References

Wine regions of Portugal
Portuguese products with protected designation of origin